Fountain Farm is an extinct town in Washington County, in the U.S. state of Missouri.

Fountain Farm was named for a spring near the rural town site.

References

Ghost towns in Missouri
Former populated places in Washington County, Missouri